Pete & Cleo is a 2010 independent comedy-drama film written and directed by Holt Hamilton.

Cast 
 Ernest "Ernie" David Tsosie III as Pete
 Beau Benally as Cleo
 Ethel Begay as Shima

See also
 Turquoise Rose
 Blue Gap Boy'z
 James and Ernie, a Navajo comedy duo

External links
 
 Holt Hamilton Productions
 "Pete & Cleo" tells a story every Navajo family can enjoy at Navajo Times

2010 films
2010 comedy-drama films
Navajo-language films
Films about Native Americans
Films set on the Navajo Nation
American comedy-drama films
2010s English-language films
2010s American films